Garhwa Road Junction railway station (station code: GHD) is a railway station located in Palamu district, Jharkhand, India, some  from the town of Garhwa. It belongs to East Central Railway. All major express and passenger trains stop here. 

Three rail section originate from the Garhwa Road Junction : 

 Garhwa Road - Sone Nagar rail section
 Garhwa Road - Barkakana rail section
 Garhwa Road - Chopan rail section

See also
 Daltonganj
 Palamu Loksabha constituency
 Jharkhand Legislative Assembly

References

External links

Railway stations in Palamu district
Railway junction stations in Jharkhand
Dhanbad railway division